István Oláh Nelu (born 25 January 1972) is a Hungarian biathlete. He competed in the men's 20 km individual event at the 1992 Winter Olympics.

References

External links
 

1972 births
Living people
Hungarian male biathletes
Hungarian male cross-country skiers
Olympic biathletes of Hungary
Olympic cross-country skiers of Hungary
Biathletes at the 1992 Winter Olympics
Cross-country skiers at the 1992 Winter Olympics
Sportspeople from Miercurea Ciuc
20th-century Hungarian people